Coenonympha haydenii, or Hayden's ringlet, is a species of brush-footed butterfly in the family Nymphalidae.

The MONA or Hodges number for Coenonympha haydenii is 4581.

References

Further reading

 

Coenonympha
Articles created by Qbugbot
Butterflies described in 1872
Butterflies of North America
Taxa named by William Henry Edwards